Yan Mosesov (born 31 March 2000) is a Belarusian professional footballer, who plays for Vitebsk.

References

External links 
 
 

2000 births
Living people
Sportspeople from Vitebsk
Belarusian footballers
Association football midfielders
FC Vitebsk players